Beau Baird is an American businessman and politician from the state of Indiana. A member of the Republican Party, he has served as Chair of the Putnam County Republican Party since March 2017, replacing Jerry Ensor. On November 6, 2018, Baird was elected to the Indiana House of Representatives, replacing his father, Jim Baird, who was elected to Congress. Since May 2004, Beau Baird has served as Chief Financial Officer of Indiana Home Care Plus. He has a BS in financial planning from Purdue University.

References

External links

|-

Living people
Republican Party members of the Indiana House of Representatives
Year of birth missing (living people)
21st-century American politicians
Krannert School of Management alumni